Rocknest is a sand patch on the surface of Aeolis Palus, between Peace Vallis and Aeolis Mons (Mount Sharp), in Gale crater on the planet Mars.  The patch was encountered by the Curiosity rover on the way from Bradbury Landing to Glenelg Intrigue on September 28, 2012. The approximate site coordinates are: .

The sand patch is downhill from a cluster of dark rocks. NASA determined the patch to be the location for the first use of the scoop on the arm of the Mars Curiosity rover.

Discovery and material analysis
On October 7, 2012, a mysterious bright object (image), discovered in the sand at Rocknest, drew scientific interest.  Several close-up pictures (close-up 1) (close-up 2) were taken of the object and preliminary interpretations by scientists suggest the object to be "debris from the spacecraft".  Nonetheless, further images in the nearby sand have detected other bright particles (image) (close-up 1). These newly discovered objects are presently thought to be native Martian material.

On October 17, 2012 at Rocknest, the first X-ray diffraction analysis of Martian soil was performed.  The results from the rover's CheMin analyzer revealed the presence of several minerals, including feldspar, pyroxenes and olivine, and suggested that the Martian soil in the sample was similar to the weathered basaltic soils of Hawaiian volcanoes.

On September 26, 2013, NASA scientists reported the Mars Curiosity rover detected "abundant, easily accessible" water (1.5 to 3 weight percent) in soil samples at the Rocknest region of Aeolis Palus in Gale Crater. In addition, NASA reported the rover found two principal soil types: a fine-grained mafic type and a locally derived, coarse-grained felsic type. The mafic type, similar to other martian soils and martian dust, was associated with hydration of the amorphous phases of the soil. Also, perchlorates, the presence of which may make detection of life-related organic molecules difficult, were found at the Curiosity rover landing site (and earlier at the more polar site of the Phoenix lander) suggesting a "global distribution of these salts". NASA also reported that Jake M rock, a rock encountered by Curiosity on the way to Glenelg, was a mugearite and very similar to terrestrial mugearite rocks.

Images

See also

Aeolis quadrangle
Bedrock
Composition of Mars
Geology of Mars
List of rocks on Mars
Martian soil
Rock outcrop
Timeline of Mars Science Laboratory
Water on Mars

References

External links 
Curiosity Rover - Official Site
NASA - Mars Exploration Program
Volcanic rock classification

Aeolis quadrangle
Mars Science Laboratory
Rocks on Mars